Philippe de Rémi or Philippe de Beaumanoir (c. 1247–1296), contemporarily Phelippes de Beaumanoir, was a French jurist and royal official. He was a junior son of Philippe de Rémi (d. 1265), poet and bailli of the Gâtinais, who was renowned for his 20,000 verses of poetry, including La Manekine, Jehan et Blonde, and a salut d'amour.

After studying law in Orléans and perhaps Bologna, Philippe became bailli of Clermont in the county of Beauvaisis (1279), then seneschal of Poitou (1284) and the Saintonge (1287). Afterwards, he came to hold some of the most senior administrative offices in the realm: bailli of the Vermandois (1289), the Touraine (1291), and Senlis (1292).

His administrative experience formed the basis of his principal work, the Coustumes de Beauvoisis of 1283, which was first printed in 1690. Even though barely noticed in its own time, it was later regarded as one of the best works bearing on old French customary law, and was frequently referred to with high admiration by Montesquieu, who called him la lumière de son temps ("the light of his time").

References
 
 
 
 

1247 births
1296 deaths
People from Oise
13th-century French jurists
Seneschals of Poitou
Seneschals of the Saintonge
13th-century French poets
13th-century French writers